Moratalaz is a district of Madrid, Spain. It is a well-known area because musicians such as Melendi and Alejandro Sanz have lived there. Moratalaz is on east of municipality of Madrid. It has  of surface area and is delineated by the highways of M-30 to the west, M-40 to the east, M23 to the north and A-3 to the south.

Geography

Subdivision
The district is administratively divided into seven wards (Barrios):
Fontarrón (145)
Horcajo (142)
Marroquina (143)
Media Legua (144)
Pavones (141)
Vinateros (146)

History
Moratalaz arose as a commuter suburb of Madrid during the 1960s. Famous inhabitants of the district have been Elvira Lindo, Melendi, el Dioni, Alejandro Sanz, "Cleanhead" Joe McGaha, and Letizia Ortiz.

Before 1960, Moratalaz was an agglomeration of barely 40 houses with only one paved street. It was located midway on a road that connected Madrid's main cemetery Cementerio de la Almudena with the then unincorporated village of Vallecas.

The Colonia Del Ferrocarril was a housing project in the '60s that was developed in Moratalaz. The Madrid-Arganda del Rey train stopped there, and Moratalaz kept growing.

A military property gave birth to what today is one of the main streets of the district, Calle Del Pico De Los Artilleros. And an old road connecting Madrid with Castilla La Mancha gave rise to Moratalaz's main avenue, Camino De Los Vinateros.

There was extraordinary and uncontrolled development in the 1970s, thanks to the programs of the Ministry of the Housing and the construction company Urbis. That led to the typical wide avenues and open spaces of Moratalaz, where traffic lanes are separated from houses by a wide green zone in between. That concept was not very popular in the '70s, but nowadays it's much appreciated, as it's an excellent measure against noise pollution.

The distinctive emblem of Public Housing during Franco's dictatorship (a yoke traversed with arrows) can still be found in the older blocks dating from that era.

Valencian Antonio Galbis holds the Guinness Book of World Records for the largest paella that 100,000 people in Moratalaz enjoyed in 2001.

Population
In this area live 106,344 people, 9,942 of which are immigrants according to the 2006 census.

Main sights 
Moratalaz is famous for its large parks and open spaces. The Church of Jesus Christ of Latter-Day Saints (Mormons) maintains a temple in the district. It is the only Mormon temple in Spain.

Transportation 
Moratalaz is served by Metro De Madrid line 9. It has three stops in the district: Vinateros, Artilleros and Pavones; a fourth station, Estrella, lies under the M-30 motorway between Moratalaz and the Retiro district.

Additionally, Moratalaz is served by several bus lines and a night bus, connecting with the city center thanks to the bus line 20 as well as the line 71. Also, the train lines closest to Moratalaz are line C1 as well as line C10.

References

External links 

 
Districts of Madrid